William Alexander Stevenson  (May 7, 1934 – July 7, 2021) was a Puisne Justice of the Supreme Court of Canada from 1990 to 1992.

Early life
William Alexander Stevenson was born in Edmonton, Alberta on May 7, 1934 to Alexander Lindsay Stevenson and Eileen Harriet Burns. In 1956, he graduated from the University of Alberta with a Bachelor of Arts, and then a Bachelor of Laws in 1957. While at university, he helped found the Alberta Law Review and served as its first Editor in Chief. Upon graduation, he received the Horace Harvey Gold Medal in Law.

Legal career
He worked at the firm of Morrow, Morrow & Reynolds (subsequently Morrow, Reynolds and Stevenson, now Reynolds, Mirth, Richards & Farmer LLP) in Edmonton until 1968. Stevenson worked as counsel on Ponoka-Calmar Oils v Wakefield, the last Canadian ruling rendered by the Judicial Committee of the Privy Council.

In 1963, he became a teacher at the University of Alberta, serving as a full-time professor from 1968 until 1970 when he returned to his firm. In 1975, he was the first Chairman of the Legal Education Society of Alberta.

Judicial career
In 1975, he was appointed to the District Court of Alberta and then to the Court of Queen's Bench of Alberta in 1979. The following year he was appointed to the Court of Appeal of Alberta, where he stayed for over ten years. He also served on the Supreme Court of the Northwest Territories from 1976–1980, the Court of Appeal for the Northwest Territories from 1980–1990, and the Supreme Court of the Yukon Territory from 1978-1983. He was a founder of the Canadian Judicial Centre in the late 1980s, and was seen as a pioneer of continuing education for Canadian judges.

On September 17, 1990, he was appointed to the Supreme Court of Canada; however, he retired only two years later on June 5, 1992, for health reasons due to a progressive multidegenerative neurological condition. Between October 1990 and April 1992 he published a total of 21 reasons for judgment. 

In remarks to an Alberta Law Review reception in 2018, Supreme Court Justice Russell Brown characterized Stevenson's judgments as "models of uncommonly fine legal writing, characterized by economical, pithy and scrupulous legal analysis."

Death
Stevenson died in Edmonton on July 7, 2021 after being diagnosed with stage 4 cancer a month earlier.

Publications

Stevenson and Justice Jean E.L. Côté jointly authored the Annotations of The Alberta Rules of Court which were the basis for the Civil Procedure Encyclopedia, a five volume treatise used often by barristers and the courts.

Awards
In 1992, Stevenson received an Honorary LLD from the University of Alberta. In 1996 he was made an Officer of the Order of Canada.

References

External links
 

Lawyers in Alberta
Judges in Alberta
Justices of the Supreme Court of Canada
Officers of the Order of Canada
University of Alberta alumni
University of Alberta Faculty of Law alumni
1934 births
2021 deaths
People from Edmonton